Farentino is a surname of Italian origin. Notable people with the surname include:

Debrah Farentino (born 1959), American actress
James Farentino (1938–2012), American screen actor
Stella Farentino (born 1962), Canadian actress, former wife of James

Surnames of Italian origin